Burt Kearns is an American author, television and film producer, writer and director, and journalist, known for his work in reality television and his controversial 1999 tabloid television memoir, Tabloid Baby.

His latest book, a biography of actor Lawrence Tierney, was published in December, 2022 by the University Press of Kentucky. The Show Won't Go On: The Most Shocking, Bizarre, and Historic Deaths of Performers Onstage, which he wrote with Jeff Abraham, was published in 2019 by Chicago Review Press.

In 2018, he became a contributor to the literary pop culture website, PleaseKillMe.com. In December 2021, he began to contribute written and video pieces to Legs McNeil’s literary pop culture website, Legsville.com.

Television and film production

Writer and producer

Kearns has been a nonfiction television producer, writer, showrunner and consultant on series and shows such as Who Do You Believe?; Conspiracy Theory with Jesse Ventura; Guinness World Records Unleashed; True Tori; Way Out West; True Tori: True Confessions; L.A. Hair Confidential; Tori Spelling: Celebrity Lie Detector; Mystery Millionaire; Joe Rogan Questions Everything; Dumbest Stuff on Wheels; and Legend Quest.

He was executive producer of, and featured on-camera in, the Reelz nonfiction special program, Kardashian: The Man Who Saved OJ Simpson,  He was executive producer of the Reelz nonfiction specials, Time Presents: Celebrities On Trial  El Chapo & Sean Penn: Bungle In The Jungle; Entertainment Weekly Presents: 80s TV Stars - Where Are They Now?; and Time Presents: Milestones 2016 - A Tribute To The Stars We've Lost.

Kearns also produced the documentary films Death of a Beatle (2000) and Bin Laden's Escape (2005) (with Parco Productions). Directed and produced the documentary, Boxing: A Different Look for Showtime and Hollywood Animal Crusaders (featuring John Travolta, Cher, Don Johnson and Esai Morales) for Animal Planet. Co-producer of the HBO documentary Panic, starring Kim Basinger. Producer of Fox Television special, When Good Pets Go Bad 2, and executive producer of the syndicated series, Strange Universe.

Independent features and Good Story Productions
Kearns produced the nonfiction film comedy, High There, which premiered August 25, 2014 as an official selection of the Action on Film International Film Festival in Monrovia, California and won  the Viewers' Choice Award at first annual Cannabis Film Festival in Humboldt County, California on May 15, 2015.  High There was released on VOD and limited edition DVD by BRINKvision on June 23, 2015.

Kearns directed, wrote and produced the nonfiction film, El Viaje Musical de Ezekiel Montanez: The Chris Montez Story, which was previewed as a work-in-progress on August 15, 2009 at the 35th annual The Fest For Beatles Fans in Chicago, November 21, 2009 at the Paso Robles Digital Film Festival  and May 14, 2010 at the Pacific Palisades Film Festival.

Both films were produced through his Good Story Productions production company.

Frozen Pictures
In 2000, Kearns formed the production company Frozen Television (later Frozen Pictures) with producer Brett Hudson, formerly of the Hudson Brothers musical comedy team. Kearns directed, wrote and produced many television shows and series under the Frozen banner, including the documentary series Adults Only: The Secret History of The Other Hollywood and The Secret History of Rock ‘n' Roll with Gene Simmons for Court TV, All the Presidents' Movies, narrated by Martin Sheen for Bravo and the Showtime late night series My First Time.

He directed and produced the 2008 Frozen Pictures documentary musical film, The Seventh Python, about the career and influence of Monty Python collaborator and Bonzo Dog Band member Neil Innes, and  directed and produced Basketball Man, the 2007 Frozen Pictures documentary film that featured basketball stars and legends telling the story of the life and legacy of the game's inventor, Dr. James Naismith. The film was released on DVD on May 8, 2007. (During the production of Basketball Man, Kearns conducted Boston Celtics legend Red Auerbach's last interview.)

Creator, producer and director of Frozen Pictures' The Michael Lohan Reality Project, and American Dunkleman, both of which became popular when their pitch tapes were released on the Internet.

Kearns received international attention, including front page stories in The New York Times and USA Today, for his controversial Saintmychal.com website and documentary project that chronicled and inherently promoted the canonization of 9/11 hero Rev. Mychal Judge.

Cloud 9
Kearns wrote and produced the 20th Century Fox movie, Cloud 9 (starring Burt Reynolds), along with Hudson and Albert S. Ruddy. The film, a joint production of Frozen Pictures, Ruddy Morgan Productions and Graymark Productions, was released on DVD by 20th Century Home Entertainment on January 3, 2006.

Tabloid Baby
Kearns left tabloid television and began writing Tabloid Baby in 1996. A combination memoir and exposé, the book was published in November 1999 by Hambleton-Hill's Celebrity Books imprint.

The book was praised by Mike Wallace of CBS News' 60 Minutes as "sad, funny, undeniably authentic"  and by tabloid television host Maury Povich as "The Bible".

Kearns embarked on a cross-country book signing, reading, radio and television tour after network news bosses reacted to his revelations about the television industry by canceling many of his scheduled television appearances.

Early career

Kearns graduated from Fairfield University; and became a reporter and editor for newspapers in southern Connecticut and Westchester, New York. After John Lennon's assassination on December 8, 1980, he moved to Manhattan, where he worked for neighborhood newspapers including The Westsider, East Side Express and Chelsea-Clinton News, and later at the assignment desk and as newswriter and show producer at WNEW-TV's 10 O'Clock News. Kearns became a producer and writer for such New York City news operations as WNBC-TV's News 4 New York and CBS News' Nightwatch and CBS Morning News.  With a background as a music writer and early chronicler of the punk music scene early in his newspaper career (he performed with Joey Ramone on the 45 rpm recording of Shrapnel's single, "Hey", produced by Jonathan Paley), he also moonlighted as a writer for Spin magazine.

Hired by Rupert Murdoch's 20th Century Fox as managing editor of the nightly tabloid television series, A Current Affair, in the late 1980s, he helped develop and expand the tabloid television genre. In 1990, Kearns accompanied executive producer and genre inventor Peter Brennan to Hollywood,  where, as managing editor and producer of Hard Copy (1990–1993) and Premier Story (1994), he continued to be an influential figure in the heyday of tabloid television.  The range of his influence on the genre and its participants was laid out clearly in the 2012 biography, Mike Wallace: A Life by Peter Rader  and Australian television executive Gerald Stone's 2011 memoir, Say It with Feeling.

Kearns (and his exploits covering the fall of the Berlin Wall) was featured in Maury Povich's 1991 memoir, Current Affairs: A Life on the Edge.  He was the model for the character Al Bunker, the tabloid television producer covering the fall of the Berlin Wall in Thomas Keneally's 1993 novel, Jacko: The Great Intruder.

Awards

Winner of 2015 Cannabis Film Festival Viewers' Choice Award as producer of High There.

Winner of 2009 Las Vegas Film Festival Golden Ace Award  for directing and producing The Seventh Python.

Emmy-winning newswriter, honored by New York City chapter of the National Academy of Television Arts and Sciences  for contributing to the winning of Outstanding News Broadcast Emmy by WNBC-TV's News 4 New York at 6PM.

True Tabloid Star
In addition to numerous television, radio and podcast appearances  promoting his books and other projects, Kearns has appeared as an expert or "talking head" on many television specials and documentaries, including Dark Side of The 90s: Tabloid TV, Kardashian: The Man Who Saved OJ Simpson, Fame for 15, Victim 0001, Rock Stars Do The Dumbest Things, Headliners & Legends with Matt Lauer  and When Cameras Cross The Line.  He was also featured in the documentary 15 Minutes of True Tabloid Stars.

Personal life
Kearns is married to television producer Alison Holloway. The couple have two children.

References

External links
 
 Burt Kearns' Emmy award

Living people
American male journalists
American film producers
Place of birth missing (living people)
Year of birth missing (living people)
American television producers
American male screenwriters
Fairfield University alumni